New Horizon is the fifteenth solo studio album by Japanese guitarist Tak Matsumoto, of B'z fame. It is an instrumental album (except for "Feel Like a Woman Tonite", with guest vocals by American singer Wendy Moten) and it was released by Vermillion Records on April 30, 2014 in Japan. The album debuted at number 3 on both the Japanese Oricon weekly album chart and the Billboard Japan album chart.

Some tracks of the album are not new; the title track was featured in a series of commercials by Japanese transportation company Sagawa Express, "Black Jack" is a rerecorded version of the Black Jack Special theme song, and "Rain" had been already performed live during their 25th anniversary tour. The album also features three covers: "Take 5", which had already been covered in Matsumoto's debut solo album Thousand Wave, and two other tracks by Japanese musicians, the only tracks with Japanese-language titles.

Track listing 

The American and European editions come with a slightly different track list (with "Take 5" as the opening track and the title track coming next) and the two Japanese-language titled tracks translated to English

Personnel 
 Tak Matsumoto - guitars on all tracks, arrangements

Session members 
 Wendy Moten - vocals on "Feel Like a Woman Tonite"
 John Ferraro - drums
 Lee Laing - drums, keyboards and wah guitar on "Feel Like a Woman Tonite"
 Shane Gaalaas - drums on "Rain"
 Lenny Castro - percussion on "Take 5"
 Travis Carlton - bass on track 1, 6, 9, 10, 11
 Bryant Siono - bass on "Feel Like a Woman Tonite"
 Barry Sparks - bass on "Rain"
 David Enos - wood bass on tracks 2, 4, 5, 7, 8
 Akira Onozuka - electric piano on tracks 1, 4, 6; piano on tracks 5, 7, 8, 9; Wurlitzer on "Black Jack" and "Gakuseigai No Kissaten"; organ on "Rain"
 Greg Vail - saxophone on tracks 1, 3, 4, 6, 10; flute on tracks 2, 3, 7; tenor saxophone on "New Horizon" and "That's Cool"
 Greg Adams - trumpet on tracks 1, 3, 4, 6, 10
 Lee Thornburg - trombone on tracks 1, 3, 4, 6, 10
 Hiroko Ishikawa of Lime Ladies Orchestra - strings on tracks 5, 7, 8

Technical staff 
 Hideyuki Terachi - arrangement
 Hiroyuki Kobayashi - recording; mixing on tracks 5, 8, 9, 11, 12; engineering
 Paul Brown - recording and engineering on tracks 1, 2, 3, 4, 6, 7, 10; mixing on tracks 1, 2, 3, 4, 6, 7, 10; arrangement on "Feel Like a Woman Tonite"

References

External links
 New Horizon - B'z Official Website

2014 albums
Being Inc. albums
Instrumental albums
Tak Matsumoto albums